Philip Chenier (born October 30, 1950) is an American former professional basketball player who was a shooting guard in the National Basketball Association (NBA) for ten seasons. He was also a television sports broadcaster for the NBA's Washington Wizards.

Early years
Born and raised in Berkeley, California, Chenier graduated from Berkeley High School and played college basketball at the University of California in Berkeley.

NBA playing career
Chenier was selected fourth in the 1971 NBA Hardship Draft by the Baltimore Bullets, and played for them for eight seasons, from 1971 to 1979. The franchise moved from Baltimore to Washington in 1973, after his second season.  He was one of the better shooting guards in the NBA for the first six seasons in his career, but he suffered a back injury early in the 1977–78 season and had season-ending surgery.  The Bullets went on to win the NBA title with Kevin Grevey as the shooting guard. Chenier was never the same player after that; he came back from his surgery late the next season, but never could crack the Bullets' starting lineup again.

Chenier was released by the Bullets after the 1978–79 season, and played briefly for the Indiana Pacers and Golden State Warriors and retired after the 1980–81 season.

Chenier, who was a 1972 NBA All-Rookie Team selection, averaged 17.2 points per game for his career, and was named to three NBA All-Star teams.

In 2017, the Wizards announced that they would retire Chenier's number 45 jersey. On March 23, 2018, Chenier's jersey was retired.

Broadcasting career
Chenier, who got his start in television sports broadcasting with Home Team Sports back in 1985, has announced black college games alongside broadcasters Charlie Neil and James Brown for Black Entertainment Television. He was the color analyst for the  Washington Bullets and Washington Wizards games on television from 1987 to 2017, with a final pairing for NBC Sports Washington alongside play-by-play commentator, Steve Buckhantz.

Personal life
Chenier resides in Columbia, Maryland, with his wife Gerry Chenier. He has two daughters, one son and grandchildren.

References

External links
Phil Chenier stats at Basketball Reference.com
Phil Chenier stats at Database Basketball.com

1950 births
Living people
African-American basketball players
American men's basketball players
Baltimore Bullets (1963–1973) players
Basketball players from Berkeley, California
Berkeley High School (Berkeley, California) alumni
California Golden Bears men's basketball players
Capital Bullets players
Golden State Warriors players
Indiana Pacers players
Mid-Atlantic Sports Network
National Basketball Association All-Stars
National Basketball Association players with retired numbers
Parade High School All-Americans (boys' basketball)
People from Columbia, Maryland
Point guards
Sportspeople from the Baltimore metropolitan area
Washington Bullets announcers
Washington Bullets players
Washington Wizards announcers
21st-century African-American people
20th-century African-American sportspeople